Dave Grusin Presents GRP All-Star Big Band Live! is a jazz album by the GRP All-Star Big Band.

Track listing

Personnel
 Dave Grusin – piano
 John Patitucci – bass
 Dave Weckl – drums
 Gary Burton – vibraphone
 Tom Scott – conductor, soprano, tenor & baritone sax
 Eric Marienthal – soprano & alto saxophones
 Nelson Rangell – soprano & alto saxophones, flute
 Bob Mintzer – soprano & tenor saxophones, bass clarinet
 Ernie Watts – soprano & tenor saxophones
 Arturo Sandoval –trumpet, flugelhorn
 Chuck Findley – trumpet, flugelhorn
 Randy Brecker – trumpet, flugelhorn
 Byron Stripling – trumpet, flugelhorn
 George Bohanon – trombone
 Phillip Bent – flute
 Eddie Daniels – clarinet
 Russell Ferrante – piano
 Gary Lindsay – arranger

Technical personnel
 Keiichi Yamada – assistant engineer
 Yasuhisa Yoneda – photography
 Katsuya Koike – photography
 Hiroshi Aono – production coordination
 Wally Traugott – mastering
 Dan Serrano – art direction
 Scott Johnson – art direction
 Darren Mora – assistant engineer, mixing
 Bernie Kirsh – engineer, mixing
 Geoff Mayfield – liner notes
 Michael Landy – post-production
 Joseph Doughney – post-production
 Diane Dragonette – assistant coordinator, production coordination
 Alba Acevedo – design

References

1993 live albums
GRP Records live albums
Dave Grusin albums
Instrumental albums
Big band albums